Adrianus Johannes "Arie" Zwart  (30 August 1903, Rijswijk - 27 August 1981, Laren) was a Dutch painter and in his early work one of the last painters of the Hague School.

Life 
Zwart studied at the Royal Academy of Art, The Hague in 1918 and 1919. Until 1926 he worked also as a graphic designer. Zwart travelled in the 1920s with a car and later with a boat though the Netherlands to paint the traditional life and landscape of the country.

After 1949 he traveled to foreign countries and left the traditional Dutch painting.

External links 
 http://www.ajzwart.nl
 https://web.archive.org/web/20140112182039/http://www.kunstgalerie-arnold.nl/artist.asp?GroupID=265

1903 births
1981 deaths
20th-century Dutch painters
Dutch landscape painters
Dutch male painters
Hague School
People from Rijswijk
Royal Academy of Art, The Hague alumni
19th-century Dutch male artists
20th-century Dutch male artists